Raw Hamburger is a 1999 album by alternative comedian Neil Hamburger. It was released by Drag City on February 2, 1999.

Track listing

"Introduction" (0:28)
"Stewardesses" (1:09)
"Freebasing" (1:51)
"Snoop Doggy Dogg" (0:55)
"Cursing" (4:02)
"Bestiality" (1:39)
"Fags" (0:44)
"Beaver" (1:41)
"Comedians' Wives" (1:36)
"Divorce" (2:19)
"Naked Cheerleaders" (1:55)
"Cloning" (0:11)
"Dirty Diapers" (0:17)
"Living Life on the Edge" (1:20)
"Movies" (3:54)
"The Right to Die" (3:42)
"Alzheimer's" (0:46)
"AIDS" (0:38)
"She Sits Among the Cabbages and Peas" (2:50)

References

Gregg Turkington albums
Drag City (record label) albums
1998 albums